The 1955–56 Serie C was the eighteenth edition of Serie C, the third highest league in the Italian football league system.

Final classification

Relegation tie-breaker

Colleferro relegated to IV Serie.

Serie C seasons
3
Italy